Wolfgang Plath (27 December 1930 – 19 March 1995) was a German musicologist specialising in research on Wolfgang Amadeus Mozart.

Life
Born in Riga, Plath studied musicology under Walter Gerstenberg, first at the Free University of Berlin, then at University of Tübingen. His PhD thesis in 1958 dealt with the Klavierbüchlein für Wilhelm Friedemann Bach.

In 1959, he became the assistant of Ernst Fritz Schmid in Augsburg and the International Mozarteum Foundation appointed him, together with Wolfgang Rehm, editor of the Neue Mozart-Ausgabe; Plath held this position until his death. He also worked as honorary professor at the universities of Augsburg and Salzburg.

In 1977, he received the Austrian Decoration for Science and Art, 1st Class. He died in Augsburg, aged 64.

Further reading 
 Dietrich Berke:  In Marianne Danckwardt und Wolf-Dieter Seiffert (eds.):  (1930–1995). Augsburg, 13 to 16 June 2000. Bärenreiter, Kassel etc. 2003, .
 Wolfgang Rehm: Wolfgang Plath (1930–1995). In Die Musikforschung, 48 (1995), vol. 3. Kassel, July–September 1995, .
 Wolfgang Rehm: Wolfgang Plath in memoriam. In , 43 (1995), vol. 1–2, Salzburg, June 1995, .
 Wolfgang Rehm:  In , 44 (1996), vol. 1–2, Salzburg, June 1996, .

References

External links 
Works edited by Wolfgang Plath at the International Music Score Library Project

1930 births
1995 deaths
Writers from Riga
Free University of Berlin alumni
University of Tübingen alumni
Recipients of the Austrian Cross of Honour for Science and Art, 1st class
Mozart scholars
20th-century German historians
20th-century German musicologists